The Campaign for Primary Accountability is a nonpartisan Super PAC created in 2011. Founded by Leo Linbeck III and Eric O'Keefe, the group's goal is to defeat longtime and unpopular incumbents of both the Republican Party and Democratic Party.

History
In 2012, the group's efforts to unseat incumbents in congressional primaries were featured in The Washington Post, The New York Times, The Wall Street Journal, and USA Today.

References

United States political action committees
Organizations established in 2011
2011 establishments in the United States